Journal of Experimental Zoology is a peer-reviewed scientific journal of zoology established in 1904. In 2003, the journal was split into the Journal of Experimental Zoology Part A: Ecological Genetics and Physiology, currently edited by David Crews and Randy Nelson and the Journal of Experimental Zoology Part B: Molecular and Developmental Evolution, currently edited by Ehab Abouheif. Both parts are currently published by Wiley-Blackwell. Originally, part A was called Comparative Experimental Biology until 2007 when it changed to Ecological Genetics and Physiology, but it is now titled Ecological and Integrative Physiology. Part B has kept the name it took during the split, Molecular and Developmental Evolution.

References

External links 
  J. Exp. Zool. A
  J. Exp. Zool. B

Publications established in 1904
Zoology journals
Wiley-Blackwell academic journals
English-language journals